Zhongshan District is a district of the city of Liupanshui, Guizhou province, China.

External links

County-level divisions of Guizhou
Liupanshui